Silas DeMary (born December 12, 1971) is an American former offensive lineman/defensive lineman for in the Arena Football League. He played for the Carolina Cobras, Buffalo Destroyers, Los Angeles Avengers and the Cleveland Gladiators. He is most notable for winning the Arena Football League Defensive Player of the Year Award in 2005, while a member of the Avengers.

High school career
While attending Bishopville High School in Bishopville, South Carolina, DeMary lettered in football, basketball

College career
Silas DeMary attended Virginia State University, where, as a senior, he led the team with 21 sacks, won NCAA Division II Defensive Lineman of the Year honors, and won NCAA Division II All-America honors.

Professional career

Carolina Cobras
DeMary signed with the Carolina Cobras in 2001. He was named to the All-Rookie Team following the season.

Buffalo Destroyers
In 2002 and 2003, DeMary played for the Buffalo Destroyers. Playing mostly offensive line, DeMary recorded very few stats with the Destroyers.

Los Angeles Avengers
In 2004 through 2007, DeMary played with the Los Angeles Avengers. While an Avenger, DeMary had the best seasons of his professional career, twice being named to the All Arena Teams, and winning the Arena Football League Defensive Player of the Year Award in 2005. Also in 2005, DeMary set the AFL record for sacks in a season with 13.5. The previous record had been 13, held by Craig Walls.

Cleveland Gladiators
DeMary finished his AFL career while playing with the Cleveland Gladiators in 2008.

References

External links
Cleveland Gladiators bio page
AFL stats from arenafan.com

1971 births
Living people
People from Bishopville, South Carolina
American football defensive linemen
American football offensive linemen
Virginia State Trojans football players
Carolina Cobras players
Buffalo Destroyers players
Los Angeles Avengers players
Cleveland Gladiators players